Pete Shaw may refer to:

 Pete Shaw (author) (born 1966), British author, broadcaster, programmer and theatrical producer
 Pete Shaw (American football) (born 1954), American football player

See also 
 Peter Shaw (disambiguation)